Argnidae is a family of air-breathing land snails, terrestrial pulmonate gastropod mollusks.

Distribution 
Distribution of Argnidae include Europe: southern and eastern Alps and Carpathian Mountains.

Taxonomy 
The family Argnidae is classified within the informal group Orthurethra, itself belonging to the clade Stylommatophora within the clade Eupulmonata (according to the taxonomy of the Gastropoda by Bouchet & Rocroi, 2005).

Argnidae has no subfamilies (according to the taxonomy of the Gastropoda by Bouchet & Rocroi, 2005).

Genera 
Genera in the family Argnidae include:
 Agardhiella Hesse, 1923
 Argna Cossmann, 1889 - type genus. The type species of this genus is fossil, but the genus contains also recent species.
 Speleodentorcula Gittenberger, 1985

References